Washington and Lee Mock Convention is a simulated presidential nominating convention and is held every four years, during the early stages of the U.S. Presidential Primary, at Washington and Lee University.  Although Oberlin College has the distinction of having the oldest student-run mock political convention in the country, W&L's convention has the reputation for being the most accurate. It often receives gavel-to-gavel coverage on C-SPAN.

The convention simulates the nomination process for whichever party does not currently hold the presidency. Since its inception in 1908, the student body has been correct 20 out of 27 times, with only three incorrect predictions since 1948. Since 1948, they have never incorrectly predicted the Republican nominee for president.

The 2008 Mock Convention projected Hillary Clinton as the Democratic nominee for that election year. The Mock Convention was mistaken, however, as Barack Obama was eventually elected as the nominee. The 2012 Mock Convention projected Mitt Romney as the Republican nominee. In 2016, the Mock Convention projected Donald Trump would be the Republican nominee on the first ballot. In 2020, the Washington and Lee Mock Convention predicted incorrectly again, predicting Bernie Sanders would win the nomination, after his early victory in New Hampshire. Sanders dropped out of the race in April 2020, and Vice President Joe Biden would go on to win the nomination and the election.

Organization history

In the spring of 1908, William Jennings Bryan, a front-runner for the Democratic presidential candidacy, announced a visit to Lexington, Virginia, arousing interest in Washington and Lee's already political-minded campus. To capitalize on the furor, The Forum, W&L's leading political organization at the time, organized a replica of the upcoming Democratic Convention. The event was an enormous success, owing to the highly political student body: according to the Lexington Gazette, "The young gentlemen entered into the meeting with the zest of seasoned politicians plus the enthusiasm of collegians". After fierce (and occasionally chaotic) debate, the campus correctly predicted Bryan to be the 1908 Democratic nominee.

With the exception of the 1920 and 1944 elections, the Mock Convention has occurred every four years since the original 1908 election. The state delegations are known to go to great lengths for accuracy: the 1952 state chair for California, David Constine, developed a correspondence with California Governor Earl Warren, one of the leading candidates. As it rose in prominence, the convention gathered an impressive docket of speakers, including Harry S. Truman and former Vice President Alben W. Barkley. Delivering the April 30, 1956 keynote address in Doremus Gymnasium, broadcast live on the radio, then-Sen. Barkley, vice president during President Truman's 1949-53 term, who had been reelected to the Senate in 1954 without seniority as Kentucky's junior senator after having previously served as Majority Leader, was good-naturedly recounting this rise and fall from lowly congressman to senator to Leader to President of the Senate as vice president to return backbencher when he suddenly collapsed from a heart attack and died, his last words, paraphrased from Psalm 84:10: "I would rather be a servant in the house of the Lord than to sit in the seats of the mighty!" Since then, the motto of Mock Convention has been a slight alteration of these last words, "It is better to be of service than to sit in the seats of the mighty."

In addition to the convention itself, W&L hosts a large number of formal and informal celebrations in honor of the Convention and its honored guests, including parades, parties, and balls. These events have seen some of the Convention's most famous stories. In 1972, then-governor Jimmy Carter's speech at Mock Con was missed by his own press secretary, who had been celebrating with a group of W&L students and alumni. Before his famous MTV appearance, Bill Clinton played an impromptu concert for students at an off-campus party for the 1988 Convention. By 1996, the Mock Convention was acknowledged by The Washington Post as "one of the nation's oldest and most prestigious mock conventions."

Prediction history

References

External links
The Legacy of Mock Con

Elections in the United States
Washington and Lee University